Jay Jensen is an athletic trainer, most recently for the Portland Trail Blazers. He served in this role from 1994 until 2013. Previous to joining the Trail Blazers, Jensen served as athletic trainer for the Minnesota Timberwolves since 1989, when the Timberwolves first entered the NBA. He has also previously served as an assistant athletic trainer at the University of Southern California and for the Los Angeles Rams of the NFL.

While working for the Blazers, Jensen also served as the Head Athletic Trainer for the Western Conference All-Stars in 1994 and 2012. In addition to being an athletic trainer, Jay Jensen is also a certified physical therapist.

References

External links
 https://web.archive.org/web/20121024090152/http://nbata.com/AboutUs/MemberDirectory/PortlandTrailBlazers/tabid/1666/Default.aspx
 http://www.nba.com/coachfile/jay_jensen/index.html?nav=page
 https://archive.today/20130216070146/http://www.iamatrailblazersfan.com/ArticleDisplay/tabid/297/ItemID/2927/Default.aspx
 http://www.reboundmd.com/news/good_sports.php#.UQRvoSe7Pgs

Year of birth missing (living people)
Living people
Portland Trail Blazers coaches